A - B - C - D - E - F - G - H - I - J - K - L - M - N - O - P - Q - R - S - T - U - V - W - XYZ

This is a list of rivers in the United States that have names starting with the letter H.  For the main page, which includes links to listings by state, see List of rivers in the United States.

Ha 
Hackensack River - New York, New Jersey
Hackers Creek - West Virginia
Haigler Creek - Arizona
Halifax River - Florida
Halls Stream - New Hampshire
Ham Branch - New Hampshire
Hamma Hamma River - Washington
Hammonasset River - Connecticut
Hampton River - New Hampshire
Hampton River - Virginia
Hampton Falls River - New Hampshire
Hanalei River - Hawaii
Hardware River - Virginia
Harbor River - South Carolina
Harlem River - New York
Harpeth River - Tennessee
Hassayampa River - Arizona
Hatchie River - Mississippi, Tennessee
Haw River - North Carolina
Hawlings River - Maryland
Hay River - Wisconsin
Hazel River - Virginia

He - Hi 
Heart River - North Dakota
Henry Fork - West Virginia
Henrys Fork - Idaho
Hillsborough River - Florida
Hiwassee River - Georgia, North Carolina, Tennessee

Ho 
Hockanum River - Connecticut
Hocking River - Ohio
Hockomock River - Massachusetts
Hogatza River - Alaska
Hoh River - Washington
Holitna River - Alaska
Holly River - West Virginia
Holston River - Virginia, Tennessee
Homochitto River - Mississippi
Hood River - Oregon
Hoosic River - Massachusetts, Vermont, New York
Hop River - Connecticut
Horsepasture River - North Carolina
Horton Creek - Arizona
Housatonic River - Connecticut & Massachusetts
Houston River-New York

Hu - Hy 
Hudson River - New York
Huerfano River - Colorado
Huff Creek - West Virginia
Huff Run - Ohio
Hughes River - Virginia
Hughes River - West Virginia
Humboldt River - Nevada
Humptulips River - Washington
Hungry River - North Carolina
Hunt River - Rhode Island
Huron River - Michigan
Huron River - Ohio
Hurricane Creek - Alabama
Huslia River - Alaska
Hutchinson River - New York
Hyco River - North Carolina, Virginia

H